Brændstrup (older alternative spelling: Brendstrup) is a village in Southern Jutland, Denmark.

Neighbouring municipalities are Haderslev Municipality to the south of Brændstrup and Esbjerg Municipality to the west.

Brændstrup is known for its Christian school, Brændstrup Kristne Friskole, and the Harley Davidson service center located in the middle of Brændstrup was until 1 January 2017, one of only three authorized HD retailers in Denmark.

A local attraction worth noticing is Stenmanden ("The Stone Man"), a monument of unknown origin residing in the nearby Gram Storskov forest.

Notable people 
The conservative politician Johannes Jørgen Dixen Burgdorf (1917-1983), who served as a Member of Parliament from 1966 until his death, was a resident of Brændstrup.

References 

Villages in Denmark
Vejen Municipality
Cities and towns in the Region of Southern Denmark